KXRA is a news/talk radio station on 1490 AM and translator channels K262AT at 100.3 FM in Alexandria, Minnesota and K289CL at 105.7 FM in Glenwood, Minnesota owned by Leighton Broadcasting, which also owns KXRZ and KXRA-FM.

Popular shows
KXRA hosts the Alexandria areas only local talk shows.   Open Line covers news and local events Monday through Thursday at 9am cst.  On Friday, The show is Open Topic.  Another area favorite is a daily radio show, called Swap Shop. It is broadcast Monday through Saturday at 1pm cst.  Listeners can call and are put on the air live.  They broadcast items they want to sell or want to buy.   Many listeners find used vehicles, appliances, or farm machinery.  Another locally produced show is Home Grown.  Each Saturday Morning at 9am, Linda Kellerman offers advice to listeners on gardening, lawns and plants.   Other features include the reading of funeral announcements daily, county commissioners reports, Cardinal Sports (the local high school,) church services, community news, morning trivia, and the birthday club.   This station is a primary source of daily news in Alexandria.

Staff
Patty Wicken, Morning Show Host and Open Line Co-Host
Joe Korkowski, News Director and Open Line Host
Dave McClurg, Sports Director
Mark Anthony, Program director and Midday/Swap Shop Host
Ben Roberts, 5pm News Hour
Charlie Christopherson
Tom Chorley

References

External links

Radio stations in Alexandria, Minnesota
News and talk radio stations in the United States
Radio stations established in 1949
1949 establishments in Minnesota